Commodore J. K. Oppong was a Ghanaian sailor and served in the Ghana Navy. He served as Chief of Naval Staff of the Ghana Navy from March 1982 to July 1985.

References

Ghanaian military personnel
Ghana Navy personnel
Chiefs of Naval Staff (Ghana)